The posterior border of the ala, shorter than the anterior, also presents two projections separated by a notch, the posterior superior iliac spine and the posterior inferior iliac spine. The posterior superior iliac spine serves for the attachment of the oblique portion of the posterior sacroiliac ligaments and the multifidus.

See also
 Dimples of Venus

References

External links
  – "The Sacral and Coccygeal Vertebrae, Posterior View"
 

Bones of the pelvis
Ilium (bone)